Events from the year 1962 in the United States.

Incumbents

Federal Government 
 President: John F. Kennedy (D-Massachusetts) 
 Vice President: Lyndon B. Johnson (D-Texas)
 Chief Justice: Earl Warren (California)
 Speaker of the House of Representatives: vacant (until January 10), John William McCormack (D-Massachusetts) (starting January 10)
 Senate Majority Leader: Mike Mansfield (D-Montana)
 Congress: 87th

Events

January
 January 1
 The United States Navy SEALs are activated. SEAL Team One is commissioned in the Pacific Fleet and SEAL Team Two in the Atlantic Fleet.
 NBC introduces the "Laramie peacock" before a midnight showing of the series Laramie.
 January 2 – NAACP Executive Secretary Roy Wilkins praises U.S. President John F. Kennedy's "personal role" in advancing civil rights.
 January 4 – New York City introduces a subway train that operates without a crew on board.
 January 26 – Ranger 3 is launched to study the Moon but later misses its target by 22,000 miles.
 January 30 – Two of the high-wire "Flying Wallendas" are killed, when their famous 7-person pyramid collapses during a performance in Detroit, Michigan.

February
 February 3 – The United States embargo against Cuba is announced.
 February 4 – Danny Thomas founds St. Jude Children's Research Hospital.
 February 6 – Negotiations between U.S. Steel and the United States Department of Commerce begin.
 February 7 – The United States Government bans all U.S.-related Cuban imports and exports.
 February 10 – Captured American spy pilot Francis Gary Powers is exchanged for captured Soviet spy Rudolf Abel in Berlin.
 February 14 – First Lady Jacqueline Kennedy takes television viewers on a tour of the White House.
 February 20 – Project Mercury: while aboard Friendship 7, John Glenn becomes the first American to orbit the Earth, three times in 4 hours, 55 minutes.

March
 March 1 – American Airlines Flight 1, an American Airlines Boeing 707, crashes on takeoff at New York International Airport, after its rudder separates from the tail, killing all 87 passengers and eight crew members aboard.
 March 2 – Wilt Chamberlain scores 100 points in a single NBA basketball game.
 March 5–9 – Ash Wednesday Storm of 1962: One of the ten worst storms in the United States in the 20th century occurs, killing 40 people, injuring over 1,000, and causing hundreds of millions of dollars in property damage in six states. 
 March 21 – The Taco Bell fast food restaurant chain is founded by Glen Bell, in Downey, California.
 March 26 – Baker v. Carr: the U.S. Supreme Court rules that federal courts can order state legislatures to reapportion seats.

April
 April 6 – Leonard Bernstein causes controversy with his remarks before a concert featuring Glenn Gould with the New York Philharmonic.
 April 9 – The 34th Academy Awards ceremony, hosted by Bob Hope, is held at Santa Monica Civic Auditorium. Robert Wise and Jerome Robbins' West Side Story wins ten awards, including Best Motion Picture and a joint Best Director win for Wise and Robbins. The film is tied for the most nominations with Stanley Kramer's Judgment at Nuremberg; both receive 11.
 April 10 – In Los Angeles, California, the first MLB game is played at Dodger Stadium.
 April 14 – A Cuban military tribunal convicts 1,179 Bay of Pigs attackers.
 April 16 – 20-year-old Bob Dylan premieres his song "Blowin' in the Wind", at Gerde's Folk City in Greenwich Village (New York City).
 April 21 – The Century 21 Exposition World's Fair opens in Seattle, Washington, opening the Space Needle to the public for the first time.

May
 May – Larry Allen Abshier becomes the first of six (possibly seven) American defectors to North Korea.
 May 1 – Dayton Hudson Corporation opens the first of its Target discount stores in Roseville, Minnesota.
 May 24 – Project Mercury: Scott Carpenter orbits the Earth 3 times in the Aurora 7 space capsule.
 May 25 – The Baltimore Steam Packet Company, the last overnight steamboat service in the U.S., goes out of business.
 May 27 – The Centralia mine fire is ignited in Pennsylvania.

June
 June 3 – Air France Flight 007, Boeing 707 Chateau de Sully on a charter flight carrying cultural and civic leaders of Atlanta, Georgia, overruns the runway at Orly Airport in Paris; 130 of 132 passengers are killed.
 June 6 – President John F. Kennedy gives the commencement address at the United States Military Academy at West Point, New York.
 June 11 – President John F. Kennedy gives the commencement address at Yale University.
 June 15 – Port Huron Statement completed.
 June 25 – United States Supreme Court rulings:
Engel v. Vitale: the court rules that mandatory prayers in public schools are unconstitutional.
MANual Enterprises v. Day: the court rules that photographs of nude men are not obscene, decriminalizing nude male pornographic magazines.
 June 28 – The United Lutheran Church in America, the Finnish Evangelical Lutheran Church of America, the American Evangelical Lutheran Church and the Augustana Evangelical Lutheran Church merge to form the Lutheran Church in America.

July
 July 2 – The first Wal-Mart store opens for business in Rogers, Arkansas.
 July 10 – AT&T's Telstar, the world's first commercial communications satellite, is launched into orbit, and activated the next day.
 July 17 
 Nuclear testing: the "Small Boy" test shot Little Feller I becomes the last atmospheric test detonation at the Nevada Test Site.
 Robert M. White  flies the X-15 to an altitude of 314,750 feet (59 miles, 96 km) to qualify him for USAF Astronaut Wings becoming the first "winged" astronaut, and one of a few who have flown into space without a conventional spacecraft. 
 July 22 – Mariner program: the Mariner 1 spacecraft flies erratically several minutes after launch and has to be destroyed.

August
 August 5 – Marilyn Monroe is found dead at age 36 from "acute barbiturate poisoning".
 August 15 – The New York Agreement is signed trading the West New Guinea colony to Indonesia.
 August 27 – NASA launches the Mariner 2 space probe.

September
 September 12
 President John F. Kennedy, at a speech at Rice University featuring the words "We choose to go to the Moon", reaffirms that the U.S. will put a man on the Moon by the end of the decade.
 The first Kohl's department store opens in Milwaukee, Wisconsin.
 September 22 – Bob Dylan premieres his song "A Hard Rain's a-Gonna Fall" at Carnegie Hall in New York City.
 September 23 – Animated sitcom The Jetsons premieres on ABC.
 September 25 – Sonny Liston knocks out Floyd Patterson two minutes into the first round of his fight for the boxing world title at Comiskey Park in Chicago.
 September 29 – The Canadian Alouette 1, the first satellite built outside the United States and the Soviet Union, is launched from Vandenberg Air Force Base in California.
 September 30 – CBS broadcasts the final episodes of Suspense and Yours Truly, Johnny Dollar, marking the end of the Golden Age of Radio.

October

 October 1 
The first black student, James Meredith, registers at the university of Mississippi, escorted by Federal Marshals.
Johnny Carson takes over as permanent host of NBC's The Tonight Show, a post he will hold for 30 years.
 Lucille Ball and Vivian Vance return to TV with The Lucy Show, two years after the end of I Love Lucy (Vance is the first person to portray a divorcée on a weekly series).
 October 12
Groove Phi Groove Social Fellowship Incorporated is founded at Morgan State College.
The infamous Columbus Day Storm strikes the U.S. Pacific Northwest with wind gusts up to 170 mph (270 km/h); 46 are killed, 11 billion board feet (26 million m3) of timber is blown down, with $230 million U.S. in damages.
Jazz bassist/composer Charles Mingus presents a disastrous concert at Town Hall in New York City. It will gain a reputation as the worst moment of his career.
 October 13 – Who's Afraid of Virginia Woolf? opens on Broadway.
 October 14 – Cuban Missile Crisis begins: a U-2 flight over Cuba takes photos of Soviet nuclear weapons being installed. A stand-off then ensues the next day between the United States and the Soviet Union, threatening the world with nuclear war.
 October 16 – The New York Yankees defeat the San Francisco Giants 1–0 in Game 7 of the 1962 World Series.
 October 22 – In a televised address, U.S. President John F. Kennedy announces to the nation the existence of Soviet missiles in Cuba.
 October 27 – The British revue play Beyond the Fringe makes its Broadway debut.
 October 28 – Cuban Missile Crisis: Soviet Union leader Nikita Khrushchev announces that he has ordered the removal of Soviet missile bases in Cuba. In a secret deal between Kennedy and Khrushchev, Kennedy agrees to the withdrawal of U.S. missiles from Turkey. The fact that this deal is not made public makes it look like the Soviets have backed down.

November
 November 7 – Richard M. Nixon loses the California governor's race. In his concession speech, he states that this is his "last press conference" and that "you won't have Dick Nixon to kick around any more".
 November 17 – In Washington, D.C., U.S. President John F. Kennedy dedicates Dulles International Airport.
 November 20 – The Cuban Missile Crisis ends: in response to the Soviet Union agreeing to remove its missiles from Cuba, U.S. President John F. Kennedy ends the quarantine of the Caribbean nation.

December
 December 2 – Vietnam War: after a trip to Vietnam at the request of U.S. President John F. Kennedy, U.S. Senate Majority Leader Mike Mansfield becomes the first American official to make a non-optimistic public comment on the war's progress.
 December 8 – The 1962 New York City newspaper strike begins, affecting all of the city's major newspapers; it lasts for 114 days.
 December 9 – Petrified Forest National Park is established.
 December 14 – U.S. spacecraft Mariner 2 flies by Venus, becoming the first probe to successfully transmit data from another planet.
 December 24 – Cuba releases the last 1,113 participants in the Bay of Pigs Invasion to the U.S., in exchange for food worth $53 million.
December 30 – An unexpected storm buries Maine under five feet of snow, forcing the Bangor Daily News to miss a publication date for the first and only time in its history.

Undated
 American advertising man Martin K. Speckter invents the interrobang, a new English-language punctuation mark.
 Publication of Helen Gurley Brown's Sex and the Single Girl.

Ongoing
 Cold War (1947–1991)
 Space Race (1957–1975)

Births
 January 4 – Peter Steele, singer-songwriter and bass player (died 2010)
 January 6
Michael Houser, singer-songwriter and guitarist (died 2002)
Kevin Rosier, mixed martial artist and boxer (died 2015)
 January 7 – Hallie Todd, actress, producer, and screenwriter
 January 12 – Luna Vachon, American-Canadian professional wrestler (died 2010)
 January 14 – Michael McCaul, lawyer and politician
 January 17 – Denis O'Hare, actor
 January 18 – Mike Lynch, cartoonist
 January 19 – Cynthia Coffman, convicted murderer
 January 21 – Brian Hildebrand, wrestler, referee and manager (died 1999)
 January 25 – Christopher Coppola, film director and producer
 January 26
 Malcom Gregory Scott, writer, activist, and AIDS survivor 
 Anna LaCazio, singer (Cock Robin)
 January 28 – Creflo Dollar, evangelist
 January 30 – Mary Kay Letourneau, child rapist (died 2020)
 January 31 – David Oliver, actor (died 1992)
 February 2 – Michael T. Weiss, actor
 February 4
 Clint Black, country musician, record producer, and actor
 Jim O'Heir, actor and comedian
 February 6 – Axl Rose, rock singer 
 February 7
 Garth Brooks, country singer-songwriter
 David Bryan, rock musician (Bon Jovi)
 February 10 – Lisa Blunt Rochester, politician
 February 11 – Tammy Baldwin, U.S. Senator from Wisconsin from 2013
 February 22 – Lenda Murray, bodybuilder
 March 2 – Jon Bon Jovi, American musician  
 March 3
 Jackie Joyner-Kersee, athlete
 Herschel Walker, American football player
 March 7 – Cathy Wood, serial killer
 March 10
 Jasmine Guy, actress, director, singer and dancer
 Dan O'Shannon, television writer and producer 
 March 11 
 Jeffrey Nordling, actor
 Barbara Alyn Woods, actress
 March 12 – Titus Welliver, actor
 March 15 – Jimmy Baio, actor
 March 18
 Thomas Ian Griffith, actor
 Mike Rowe, television personality and presenter 
 March 21 – Matthew Broderick, actor
 March 26
 Chris Bailey, animator and film director
 John Stockton, basketball player
 Keith Diamond, actor and voice actor
 March 30 
 Mark Begich, U.S. Senator from Alaska from 2009 to 2015
 MC Hammer, rapper
 Bil Dwyer, stand-up comedian and game show host
 April 2 – Clark Gregg, actor, director, and screenwriter
 April 3 – Mike Ness, musician 
 April 4 – Melissa Hart (politician), lawyer and politician
 April 6 – Steven Levitan, director, writer and producer
 April 7 – Hugh O'Connor, actor, son of Carroll O'Connor (died 1995)
 April 8 – Izzy Stradlin, guitarist
 April 10
 Rick Florian, Christian musician and real estate agent
 Steve Tasker, American football player
 April 14 – Laura Richardson, politician
 April 15 – Tom Kane, voice actor
 April 16 – Jason Scheff, bassist
 April 17 – Bill Kopp, actor, voice actor and animator
 April 20 
 Scott McGehee, film director and screenwriter
 Hank the Angry Drunken Dwarf (Henry Joseph Nasiff Jr.), comedian (died 2001)
 April 21
 Craig Robinson, college basketball coach
 Carmen Osbahr, American-Mexican muppeteer
 April 26 
 Michael Damian, actor, recording artist and producer
 Debra Wilson, actress and comedian
 April 28 – Scott La Rock, hip-hop DJ and producer (died 1987)
 April 30 – Tom Fahn, voice actor
 May 2 – Elizabeth Berridge, actress
 May 7 – Robbie Knievel, motorcyclist and daredevil performer (died 2023)
 May 25 – Lionel James, American football player (died 2022)
 May 28 – James Michael Tyler, actor (died 2021)
 June 3 – David Cole, DJ, producer and songwriter (died 1995) 
 June 7 – Lance Reddick, actor (died 2023)
 June 12 – Jodi Thelen, actress
 June 13
 Ally Sheedy, actress
 Hannah Storm, television anchor and presenter
 June 23 
 Mark DeCarlo, actor
 Billy Wirth, actor, film producer and artist
 June 24
 Sean Vincent Gillis, serial killer
 Andrew P. Gordon, judge
 June 25 – Anthony Allen Shore, serial killer and child molester (died 2018)
 June 28 – Don Chambers, newspaper comic strip artist 
 June 30 – Deirdre Lovejoy, actress
 July 3 
 Tom Cruise, actor and film producer 
 Thomas Gibson, actor
 Hunter Tylo, actress and author, previously model
 July 5 – Jeff Innis, baseball player (died 2022)
 July 7
 Tom Conroy, state legislator
 MC Jazzy Jeff, rapper
 July 12 – Dan Murphy, rock guitarist 
 July 13 – Tom Kenny, actor and comedian
 July 14 – Jeff Olson, percussionist (Trouble) 
 July 15 – Glen Edward Rogers, serial killer
 July 17 – Fred Wadsworth, professional golfer
 July 18
 Lee Arenberg, actor
 Jack Irons, drummer
 July 31 – Kevin Greene, footballer (died 2020)
 August 4
 Roger Clemens, baseball player
 Jim Hagedorn, politician  (died 2022)
 August 8 – Jim Sweeney, footballer (died 2022)
 August 10 – Suzanne Collins, author and television writer
 August 16 – Steve Carell, comedian, actor, voice artist, producer, writer and director
 August 17 – John Marshall Jones, actor
 August 24 – Major Garrett, journalist and author
 August 25 – Tommy Blacha, comedy writer 
 August 26 – Bob Mionske, cyclist and attorney  
 August 28
 Craig Anton, actor and comedian  
 David Fincher, director and producer
 August 31 – Dee Bradley Baker, voice actor
 September 5 – Brian A. Joyce, politician (died 2018)  
 September 6 – Chris Christie, 55th Governor of New Jersey
 September 9 – Mark Linkous, singer, songwriter and musician (died 2010)  
 September 11 – Kristy McNichol, actress and singer
 September 12 – Amy Yasbeck, actress  
 September 14 – Tom Kurvers, ice hockey player (died 2021)
 September 15
 Dina Lohan, television personality 
 Rebecca Miller, actress and director 
 September 17 – Don Rogers, American football player (died 1986)  
 September 26
 Gregory Crewdson, photographer  
 Al Pitrelli, guitarist  
 October 1 – Esai Morales, actor
 October 6 – Rich Yett, baseball player 
 October 11
 Joan Cusack, actress and comedian
 Leslie Landon, actress 
 October 12
 Chris Botti, trumpeter and composer  
 Deborah Foreman, actress 
 October 13 – T'Keyah Crystal Keymáh, actress and comedian 
 October 15 – Aron Ra, author, podcaster and atheist activist
 October 21 – Drew Griffin, journalist (died 2022)
 October 23
 Doug Flutie, American football player 
 Mike Tomczak, American football player 
 October 24
 Dave Blaney, race car driver
 Mark Miller, motorcycle racer
 Jay Novacek, American football player and coach
 November 3 – Gabe Newell, co-founder and managing director of Valve
 November 10 – David Petrarca, television, film and theatre director, producer
 November 11 – Demi Moore, actress, film producer, film director, songwriter and model
 November 15
Mark Acres, basketball player and educator
Judy Gold, comedian, actress and producer
 November 18 – Kirk Hammett, metal guitarist (Exodus and Metallica)
 November 19
 Jodie Foster, actress, film director and producer
 Sean Parnell, 10th Governor of Alaska
 November 20 – Gail Ann Dorsey, musician
 November 28 – Jon Stewart, comedian and political commentator
 December 9 – Felicity Huffman, actress
 December 12 – Peter Bergen, journalist and author 
 December 17 – Richard Jewell, victim of defamation 
 December 21 – Steven Mnuchin, 77th United States Secretary of the Treasury
 December 24 – Kate Spade, born Katherine Brosnahan, fashion designer (died 2018)
 December 31 
 Don Diamont, actor
 Jeff Flake, politician
 Lance Reddick, actor

Deaths
 January 13 – Ernie Kovacs, comedian and actor (born 1919)
 January 19 – Snub Pollard, actor (born 1889 in Australia)
 January 20 – Robinson Jeffers, poet (born 1887)
 January 25 – Lucy Robins Lang, political activist (born 1884 in Russia)
 January 26 – Lucky Luciano, gangster (born 1897 in Italy)
 February 1 – Carey Wilson, screenwriter (born 1889)
 February 6 – Roy Atwell, actor, comedian and composer (born 1878)
 February 17 – Joseph Kearns, actor (born 1907)
 February 19
 James Barton, actor (born 1890)
 Georgios Papanikolaou, cytopathologist, inventor of the Pap smear (born 1883 in Greece)
 February 27 – Willie Best, actor (born 1916)
 February 28 – Chic Johnson, actor (born 1891)
 March 1 – Roscoe Ates, actor (b. 1895)
 March 15 – Arthur Compton, physicist, recipient of the Nobel Prize in Physics in 1927 (born 1892)
 March 27 – Augusta Savage, African American sculptor (born 1892)
 April 8 – Esther Kerr Rusthoi, author, poet, composer, singer, and evangelist (born 1909)
 April 10 – Manton S. Eddy, general (born 1892)
 April 20 – Grover Whalen, politician (born 1886)
 May – Helen Tufts Bailie, social reformer and activist (born 1874)
 May 28 – Robert Francis Anthony Studds, admiral and engineer, fourth Director of the United States Coast and Geodetic Survey (born 1896)
 May 31 – Henry Fountain Ashurst, politician (born 1874)
 June 9 – Polly Adler, brothel owner (born 1900 in Russia)
 July 2 – Valeska Suratt, stage actress and silent film star (born 1882)
 July 6 – William Faulkner, fiction writer, recipient of the Nobel Prize in Literature in 1949 (born 1897)
 July 25 – Nelle Wilson Reagan, mother of United States President Ronald Reagan (born 1883)
 August 5 – Marilyn Monroe, film actress and icon (born 1926)
 September 2 
 Morris Louis, painter (born 1912)
 Louis King, film director (born 1898)
 September 3 – E. E. Cummings, poet (born 1894)
 September 19 – Ben J. Tarbutton, interpreter (born 1885)
 September 24
 Sam McDaniel, actor (born 1886)
 Charles Reisner, silent film actor and director (born 1887)
 November 7 – Eleanor Roosevelt, First Lady of the United States from 1933 to 1945 (born 1884)
 November 8
 William Bailey, actor (born 1886)
 Willis H. O'Brien, stop motion animator (born 1886)
 November 9 – Carroll McComas, actress (born 1886)
 November 18 – Dennis Chávez, U.S. Senator from New Mexico from 1935 to 1962 (born 1888)
 December 4 – Jens Christian Bay, writer and librarian (born 1871 in Denmark)
 December 10 – Robert C. Giffen, admiral (b. 1886)
 December 22 – Roy Palmer, jazz trombonist (born 1892)
 December 31 – Al Mamaux, baseball player and manager (b. 1894)

See also

 List of American films of 1962
 Timeline of United States history (1950–1969)

References

External links
 

 
1960s in the United States
United States
United States
Years of the 20th century in the United States